Coolus is a commune in the Marne department in north-eastern France. It gave its name to the Coolus helmet, a type of ancient Celtic and Roman helmet.

See also
Communes of the Marne department

References

Communes of Marne (department)